Backstreet Boys is an American boy band.

Backstreet Boys or Back Street Boys may also refer to:

Artists
Wayne County and the Backstreet Boys, a short-lived punk rock band fronted by the singer now known as Jayne County

Albums
Backstreet Boys (1996 album), studio album released worldwide except the US
Backstreet Boys (1997 album), studio album only released in the US

Songs
"Back Street Boys", by The Spencer Davis Group, from the album Living in a Back Street